The National Collegiate Athletic Association (Philippines) (NCAA) holds its annual basketball tournaments for the Seniors' and Juniors' divisions from June to October of the academic year. The tournament started in 1924, the NCAA's inaugural year, and has been held continuously since then, only interrupted by World War II from 1942 to 1946, suspension of play from 1961 to 1965 due to the proliferation of ineligible players, and the 1980 riot between supporters of La Salle and Letran which wrecked the Rizal Memorial Coliseum which forced the association to suspend the rest of the season.

For much of the NCAA's history, the team at the top of the standings during the first half of the season faced the team that won the latter half of the season for the championship; in 1960 if a third team had a better cumulative record than either champion, that team played the champion of the latter half of the season to face the champion of the first half for the NCAA championship.

In 1998, the "Final Four" format used in the University Athletic Association of the Philippines (UAAP) was first applied: in a modified Shaughnessy playoff system, the two teams with the best records possess the "twice to beat advantage" in which they only have to win once to advance to the best-of-three finals while their opponents have to win twice. Prior to the introduction of the "Final Four" format, if a team managed to win all of the group stage games (or at least won both halves of the season), the team were named outright champions. At the introduction of the "Final Four" format the unbeaten team had an outright finals berth with the twice to beat advantage while the remaining three teams played in a single-elimination tournament; in 2008, the unbeaten team still qualified outright for the finals but the finals was a best-of-three series. Starting in 2010, the unbeaten team possesses the "thrice to beat" advantage where they only have to win twice while their opponent has to win thrice to win the championship. In 2017, the NCAA reverted to a rule where an unbeaten team still had a bye to the finals but the finals was a best-of-three series and the number 2 team in the stepladder series will not have twice to beat advantage.

List of champions per year

Early years (1924–1935)
The NCAA was founded by the Ateneo de Manila, De La Salle College, the Institute of Accounts (known today as Far Eastern University), National University,  San Beda College, the University of Manila, the University of the Philippines Manila and the University of Santo Tomas. Membership was fluid, and the composition of the association changed frequently. To this date, San Beda is the only founding member left in the association.

The old-timer six (1936–68)
After National University, University of the Philippines Manila, and University of Santo Tomas left the NCAA in 1932, the Ateneo de Manila, Colegio de San Juan de Letran, De La Salle College, José Rizal College, Mapúa Institute of Technology and San Beda College continued the association and its membership remained unchanged for several decades.

World War II interrupted the NCAA's activities in 1941, but the association resumed operations after the war in 1947.

First expansion (1969–78)
San Sebastian College–Recoletos was admitted in 1969, marking the first change in the NCAA's membership since 1936. This increased the association's membership to seven colleges. Trinity College of Quezon City was also admitted in 1974, the association's golden anniversary, according to publications of the day.

First contraction (1978–84)
The Ateneo de Manila University left the association in 1978 after the championship series against San Beda College where the final game was held behind closed doors. In September 1980, De La Salle University withdrew from the association after an August 17 game against Colegio de San Juan Letran turned into a full-blown riot which led to the game being called off. The association ordered the game to be replayed behind closed doors but the then-FIBA recognized basketball association, the Basketball Association of the Philippines, ordered the association to cancel the rest of the season.

San Beda College left in 1984 to concentrate on intramural events.

Second expansion (1984–95)
After the Ateneo de Manila, La Salle, and San Beda left, the NCAA opened its doors to new members. In 1984, Perpetual Help College of Rizal was accepted as a new member, while Trinity College of Quezon City became a full member in 1985, after the Stallions were admitted earlier provisionally, in 1974). San Beda rejoined the association in 1986, while Trinity left in the same year.

Third expansion (1996–2009)

In 1996, Philippine Christian University became the seventh member of the NCAA. Two years later, De La Salle–College of Saint Benilde was admitted as the eighth member.

The Final Four format as used in the UAAP was first applied in 1998.

Fourth expansion (2009–present)
In 2009, Angeles University Foundation (AUF), Arellano University, Emilio Aguinaldo College (EAC) participated as guest members for the 2009–10 season; only Arellano and EAC were accepted as members on probation starting on the 2010–11 season. In 2011, Lyceum of the Philippines University was invited as a guest team that would play on the 2011–12 season. Arellano was elevated to regular membership after all the association requirements were met. EAC and Lyceum remained on probation; their status and performances were evaluated at the end of the 2014-15 season. Weeks before the start of NCAA Season 91, EAC and Lyceum were elevated to regular membership.

List of championships per school

Championship streaks

Statistics
 Longest finals appearances

 Longest finals match-ups between two teams

 Longest championship streaks

 Longest championship droughts

 Elimination sweeps

Notes:
a.The traditional Final Four format was used instead of the stepladder format due to round robin tournament. 2021-22 season was played in early 2022.

Notes

   The Juniors tournament was suspended from 1962 to 1965 by the NCAA Board of Control when it was revealed that several schools fielded ineligible players.
Suspended by the NCAA due to hooliganism and proliferation of ineligible players
   Seniors championships awarded in the 1963–64 and 1964–65 seasons were later ruled as unofficial by the NCAA.
 Tournament aborted by the Basketball Association of the Philippines
 Colegio de San Juan de Letran returned the Juniors trophy after a player was found to be ineligible.
      Denotes schools no longer in the association
 Includes one midgets' division championship. Ateneo had shared junior's championships in the 1931–32 and 1935–36 seasons.
  De La Salle–College of Saint Benilde, a college without pre-college education units, does not field a juniors' (high school) team. La Salle Green Hills fields seniors' teams on behalf of De La Salle–College of Saint Benilde.
  La Salle Green Hills, a K-12 school, does not field a seniors' (collegiate) team. De La Salle–College of Saint Benilde fields seniors' teams on behalf of La Salle Green Hills.
  Malayan High School of Science, a secondary educational institution, does not field a seniors' (collegiate) team. Mapua Institute of Technology fields seniors' teams on behalf of Malayan High School of Science.
Shared juniors' championship in a given season.

See also
 UAAP Basketball Championship

References
Specific

General

External links
 NCAA Philippines official website

Basketball list
NCAA